Synnøve Tronsvang (born 22 June 1943) is a Norwegian politician for the Labour Party.

She served as a deputy representative to the Norwegian Parliament from Hedmark during the term 1981–1985. In total she met during 8 days of parliamentary session.

References

1943 births
Living people
Labour Party (Norway) politicians
Deputy members of the Storting
Hedmark politicians
20th-century Norwegian women politicians
Place of birth missing (living people)